Entente Boulet Rouge-Riche Mare Rovers is a Mauritian football club based in Central Flacq. They play in the Mauritian League, the top division in Mauritian football.

Stadium
Their home stadium is Stade Auguste Vollaire (cap. 4,000), located in Central Flacq.

References

External links
Soccerway
https://web.archive.org/web/20140302020412/http://www.fussball-statistiken.com/?sport=soccer&page=team&id=18737&localization_id=it

Football clubs in Mauritius